Sikandarpur Ghosi is a large village located in the district of Gurgaon in the state of Haryana in India. It has a population of about 5,586 living in around 1,212 households.

This village is dominated by Yadavs and lies near the MG road. There is a Delhi Metro station in Sikandarpur. Nearby villages are Nathupur and Chakkarpur.The village is in its developing state.

See also
 Yaduvanshi Ahirs
 Gurgaon
 Haryana

References 

Villages in Gurgaon district